Following the huge success of the first season of Arab Idol, MBC launched the second season on 8 March 2013. The jury panel, composed of Ahlam, Ragheb Alama and Hassan El Shafei, is completed by Lebanese pop star Nancy Ajram. The top 27 was announced on 6 April 2013 and the first prime is scheduled for 19 April. 13 contestants should reach the final stage, compared with the first season where only 10 contestants were picked. On finale night, Mohammed Assaf from Palestine won the competition against Ahmad Gamal (from Egypt) and Farah Youssef (from Syria). There was an estimated 60 million votes. media and was welcomed with joy by Palestinians and the rest of the Arab world. This year was a premiere since it will be the first time that there is a non-Arab/non-Arabic speaker contestant (Parwas Hussain, from the Kurdish part of Iraq).

Auditions 
Ten dates were set for the auditions, which took place in 8 Arab countries (three audition dates in three different Egyptian cities).

 Luxor, Egypt, October 11, 2012
 Alexandria, Egypt, October 15, 2012
 Cairo, Egypt, October 19, 2012
 Casablanca, Morocco, October 28, 2012
 Tunis, Tunisia, November 2, 2012
 Amman, Jordan, November 8, 2012
 Erbil, Iraq, November 11, 2012
 Dubai, United Arab Emirates, November 15, 2012
 Beirut, Lebanon, November 19, 2012
 Doha, Qatar auditions were originally scheduled for November 15, 2012, but the city was excluded after the citizens of Qatar made a campaign on the internet to prevent the arrival of the show crew, in the excuse that the show doesn't align with the habits and traditions of the conservative Qatari community and the Islamic values.

Second round 

After more than 15,000 auditions, the judges picked 95 to go onto the following round in Beirut, Lebanon. The second round of auditions consisted of three parts, the first of which saw candidates sing a song of their choice for 60 seconds in front of the panel in groups of 10. Only 61 made it through to the second part of the second round. In this part of the competition, candidates were split into 11 groups of 5 or 6, and had to perform iconic Arabic songs from movies and plays from the previous century. The repertoire consisted of the following songs :

For the girls:
 "Mali" (by Warda Al-Jazairia) from the movie "Sawt El Hob" (1973)
 "El Ward Gamil" (by Umm Kulthum) from the movie "Fatmah" (1947)
 "Rajain Ya Hawa" (by Fairuz), from the Rahbani Brothers's play "Loulou" (1974)
 "Ya Wad Ya Teel" (by Souad Hosni) from the movie "Khali Balak Min Zouzou" (1972)
 "Imta Hataaraf/ Layali El Ouns" (by Asmahan) from the movie "Gharam wa Intiqam" (1944)

For the guys:
 "Ya Msafer Wahdak" (by Mohammed Abdelwahab), from the movie "Mamno' El Hob" (1942)
 "Gana El Hawa" (by Abdelhalim Hafez), from the movie "Abi Foq El Shagara" (1969)
 "Gharibeyn Ou Layl" (by Ghassan Saliba), from the Rahbani Brothers' play "Saif 840" (1987)
 "Gabbar" (by Abdelhalim Hafez), from the movie "Maabodat El Gamahir" (1963)
 "Habeena" (by Farid El Atrash), from the movie "Nagham Fi Hayati" (1975)
 "Ana Elli Alayki Mishta'" (by Joseph Sakr), from Ziad Rahbani's play "Nazl El Sourour" (1974)

After further cuts, only 46 contenders remained, and moved onto the third and final part of the second round of auditions. The remaining competitors had to sing for their lives, of whom only 20 were to be chosen. However, this task proved to be too hard for the judges because of the great talent present. Thus, 27 contestants were hand-picked instead of 20 for the public vote, who had to choose only 12 of them to reach the final round of competitions.

 The 27 contestants representing 10 Arab countries were revealed on April 6, 2013, and they are :

From Egypt: Karim Houssam (18), Sabrine El Nagily (20), Mirna Hisham (15), Ahmad Gamal (24), Haidy Moussa (19), Meriem Mohammad (16), Nourhane El Boghdadi (23) 
From Morocco: Fatima-Zahra El Qortoubi (27), Salma Rachid (18), Omar El Idrissi (24), Jamal Abbad (25), Yousra Saouf (20)
From Tunisia: Mohammed Dughman (24), Zouhour El Shaari (23), and Mohammed Amer (26) 
From Syria: Farah Youssef (21), Abdelkarim Hamdan (25) 
From Iraq: Parwas Hussain (24), Oussama Naji (23), Mohannad Almarsoumi (27)  
From Lebanon: Ziad Khouri (24), Wael Said (18) 
From Saudi Arabia: Ibrahim Abdallah (25), Fares El Madani (27) 
From Algeria: Saad Nizar (28) 
From Bahrain: Hanane Reda (21) 
From Palestine: Mohammed Assaf (23)

Semi-final

Top 13 Elimination chart

References

Repertoire 

Week 1 (April 26, 2013)
 Guest/Mentor: Nawal El Kuwaitia

Week 2 (May 3, 2013)
 Guest/Mentor: Samira Said

Week 3 (May 10, 2013)
 Guest/Mentor: Ramy Ayach

Week 4 (May 17, 2013)
 Guest/Mentor: Nawal El-Zoughby

Week 5 (May 24, 2013)
 Guest/Mentor: Mohammed Mounir

Week 6 (May 31, 2013)
 Guest/Mentor: Cheb Khaled

Week 7 (June 7, 2013)
 Guest/Mentor: Diana Haddad

Week 8 (June 14, 2013)
 Guest/Mentor: Sherine

Week 9 (June 21, 2013)
 Guest/Mentor: Assi El Helani

2013 Lebanese television seasons
Idols (franchise)